Alan Henry Peel (29 December 1908 – 23 November 1992) was an Australian rules footballer who played for the St Kilda Football Club in the Victorian Football League (VFL).

He later served in the 	Australian Army during World War II.

Notes

External links 
		

1908 births
1992 deaths
Australian rules footballers from Victoria (Australia)
St Kilda Football Club players